Lenny the Wonder Dog is a 2005 American comedy film about the eponymous dog, Lenny, directed by Oren Goldman from a screenplay written by Michael Winslow, and filmed on locations in Florida.   The cast included many prominent actors and celebrities such as Craig Ferguson and Andy Richter as the voice of Lenny. The movie had television release in Europe and after video release received generally poor reviews.

The film is notable for being one of Oscar Isaac's earliest roles.

Plot 
Doctor Island (Joe Morton) has invented a computer microchip he plans to use to train dogs instantly. However, his former colleague, Doctor Wagner (Craig Ferguson), has other plans for the microchip: he wants to implant copies in every child in order to brainwash them to come work for him after they turn 18, and be exceedingly loyal. In the fight between Doctor Island and Doctor Wagner's henchmen, Hanky (Andrew Shaifer), Panky (Jeff Chase), and Doctor Island get injured and his dog Lenny (Andy Richter) is injected with the computer microchip. On the run, Lenny finds his brainpower growing. And when he finds a young boy, Zach (Sammy Kahn), to be his friend and savior, Lenny discovers he can talk. Lenny (continually amazed by the new powers the embedded microchip keeps giving him), Zach (full of unrequited love for longtime friend Becky), and school newspaper reporter Becky (Stephanie Sherrin) (out to write the story of the century) team up with downtrodden police officer John Wyndham (Michael Winslow) to defeat Dr. Wagner and his henchmen. The showdown culminates at the school concert given by Pop Star Angie (Maria de los Angeles Monasterio), where Zach's inspiring speech and Lenny's audio powers combine to incriminate Doctor Wagner, who is arrested by the police captain, now appreciative of Officer Wyndham's talents for police-work and crime-solving.

Cast 
 Sammy Kahn as Zach
 Joe Morton as Dr. Island
 Andy Richter as the voice of Lenny
 Craig Ferguson as Dr. Richard Wagner
 Kathy Kinney as Lisa Lathers
 Michael Winslow as John Wyndham
 Jeff Chase as Panky
 Evan Adams as Razel
 Paola Turbay as Mrs. Ripley
 Camila Banus as Rainbow
 Oscar Isaac as Detective Fartman
 Stephanie Sherrin as Becky
 Andrew Shaifer as Hanky
 "Boomer" as Lenny
 Rus Blackwell as Harley
 Jeffrey William Evans as Chief Greenwald
 Damaris Justamante as Mayor Jenkins
 Maria de los Angeles Monasterio as Angie
 P.C. Martinez as Bodyguard
 Graham Purdy as Jeremy
 Roberto Smith as Henry

Release
Filmed at locations in Florida under the working title of A Dog and his Boy, the film had its first television release December 5, 2005 in Hungary as Lenny, a Csodakutya, followed by screening in Germany as Lenny, der Wunderhund, in Finland as Lenny ihmekoira, and in France as Lenny le chien parlant. Later French DVD release was as Lenny Wonderdog.
DVD releases include by North by Northwest Entertainment in 2005, Third Millennium in 2006, Boulevard Entertainment in 2007, and Peace Arch Trinity in 2008.

Reception
Lenny the Wonder Dog has received generally negative reviews. Common Sense Media panned the film giving it one star and writing "a baffling plot, cheap special effects, the repetitious chase scenes, and overall silliness make this movie almost unwatchable for adults", adding "though kids might find the visual jokes and pratfalls hilarious, the film sets the quality bar at a very low level."  They also offered that Craig Ferguson's performance as the megalomaniacal Dr. Richard Wagner, "is so over-the-top it could become a career landmark."

The Dove Foundation criticized the language used in the film as non-family friendly, writing "Although this is an off-the-wall comedy that is geared toward the family, it cannot be family approved due to some language issues."

Florida real estate developer Jeff Sherrin "politely but abruptly shrugs off" any question about the film. His daughter, Stephanie Sherrin, appeared in this film as well as in Kids in America.

References

External links 
 
  at the Wayback Machine

2000s adventure comedy films
2004 films
2005 films
American adventure comedy films
Films about dogs
2004 comedy films
2005 comedy films
2000s English-language films
2000s American films
2010s American films